The Bucheon International Fantastic Film Festival, or BiFan, is an international film festival held annually in July in Bucheon, South Korea. Prior to 2015, it was known as the Puchon International Fantastic Film Festival or PiFan. Inaugurated in 1997, the festival focuses on South Korean and international horror, thriller, mystery and fantasy films, with particular attention to Asian cinema from East Asia and Southeast Asia.

The 25th Bucheon International Fantastic Film Festival was held from 8 to 18 July 2021, it featured 257 films from 47 countries. The film festival due to the impact of the COVID-19 is held in a 'hybrid' format (online and offline) at 5 different locations including Oul Madang and CGV Picnic. As per quarantine guidelines for COVID-19 pandemic containment, online screening of 154 films (61 feature films, 93 short films), which is about 60 % of the entire film festival are open on  WAAVE over-the-top (OTT) service.

Program
The festival's programming consists of following sections:
 Opening film	
 Bucheon Choice	
 Bucheon Choice Features	
 Bucheon Choice: Shorts 1	Edit
 Bucheon Choice: Shorts 2
 Korean Fantastic	
 Korean Fantastic: Competition	
 Korean Fantastic: Features	
 Korean Fantastic: Shorts
 World Fantastic Red
 World Fantastic Blue
 Family Zone
 Forbidden Zone
 Strange Hommage
 Fantastic Short Films
 Vertical Short Film Special Screening : 25
 BIFAN x wavve Online Screening

Awards
The festival is a non-competitive international film festivals with partial competition. It gives away following awards:

 Bucheon Choice: It is the international competition section of the Bucheon International Fantastic Film Festival. It offers these awards:
Bucheon Choice Feature: 
Best Picture (Award of KRW 20 million)
Director Award (5 million won in prize money)
Special Jury Prize (5 million won in prize money)
Featured Audience Award
Bucheon Choice: Short
Best Short Film (5 million won in prize money)
Short Film Jury Award (3 million won in prize money)
Short Audience Award
Korean Fantastic: This is a domestic competition section for the Korean films.
Korean Fantastic: Feature
Korean Fantastic Film Award (20 million won in prize money)
Korean Fantastic Director Award (5 million won in prize money)
Korean Fantastic Actor Award (2 people)
Korean Fantastic Audience Award
NH Agricultural Negotiation (distribution support award, 10 million won)
CGV Award (Distribution Support Award, 10 million won)
Best Feature Award (2 films, 5 million won each)
Korean Fantastic: Short
Korean Fantastic Short Film Award (5 million won in prize money)
Korean Fantastic Short Audience Award
Best Short Film that Watcha noticed (5 episodes, 1 million won each)
Méliès International Film Festival Federation (MIFF) Asian Film Award: This award is given for the purpose of discovering and promoting Asian fantastic genre films. 
NETPAC award: This award is awarded by Netpack, the Asian Film Promotion Organization.
Odd Family Award: Instituted from 26th edition, it is awarded to the Best Film from the 'Odd Family section' by BIFAN Strange Children Jury, composed of children of Bucheon City.
Series Film Award: Instituted from 26th edition, it is awarded to the best drama series.

History
 The 11th edition of PiFan, held from 12 to 24 July 2007, featured 225 films from 33 countries. 
The 12th edition of PiFan was held from 18 July to 27 July 2008.
The 18th edition of Puchon International Fantastic Film Festival (PiFan) was held from 17 July to 27 July 2014, featuring 210 films from 47 countries.
 The 19th Bucheon International Fantastic Film Festival took place from 16 to 26 July, 2015. It showcased 235 films from 45 countries.
 The 20th Bucheon International Fantastic Film Festival took place from 21 to 31 July, 2016. It showcased 320 films from 49 countries.
 The 21st edition of BiFan was held from 13 July to 23 July 2017. It featured 289 films from 58 countries.
 The 22nd edition of BiFan was held from 12 July to 22 July 2018. It featured 290 films from 53 countries.
 The 23rd Bucheon International Fantastic Film Festival took place from June 27 to 7 July, 2019. It featured 299 films from 54 countries (166 Features, 133 Shorts).
 The 24th Bucheon International Fantastic Film Festival took place from July 9 to 16, 2020. It featured 194 films from 42 countries.
 The 25th Bucheon International Fantastic Film Festival was held from 8 to 18 July 2021, it featured 257 films from 47 countries.
 The 26th Bucheon International Fantastic Film Festival was held from 7 to 17 July 2022, it featured 268 films from 49 countries. From this edition a new award titled as 'Series Film Award' was started. The first Series Film Award was awarded to Squid Game.

Boycott
The festival faced a boycott in 2005 to protest what was seen by critics as meddling by Bucheon mayor Hong Geon-pyo. A rival event called RealFanta was organized that year on the same dates as BiFan by former festival director Kim Hong-joon. The festival returned in 2006 without any dispute under the direction of veteran filmmaker Lee Jang-ho and a new programming team.

See also
 European Fantastic Film Festivals Federation

Other genre film festivals
 Sitges Film Festival
 Fantasporto
 Fantasia International Film Festival
 Fantastic Fest
 Screamfest Horror Film Festival
 Brussels International Festival of Fantasy Film
 Fantafestival
 Lusca Fantastic Film Fest
List of festivals in South Korea
List of festivals in Asia

References

External links

 
Film festivals in South Korea
Fantasy and horror film festivals
Film festivals established in 1997
1997 establishments in South Korea
Culture in Bucheon
Annual events in South Korea
Summer events in South Korea
Festivals in Gyeonggi Province